Cilibia is a commune in Buzău County, Muntenia, Romania. It is composed of five villages: Cilibia, Gara Cilibia, Mânzu, Movila Oii and Poșta.

Notes

Communes in Buzău County
Localities in Muntenia